The Reception Building, once known as the Reception Saloon, is a historic building at the corner of 2nd Street and Browning Avenue in Cordova, Alaska.  Set into a hillside, it is a wood-frame structure with two stories at the front and one at the rear.  Built in 1908, it is one of the few surviving buildings associated with the early days of the city's development.  The Reception Saloon was established by Owen Webster "Link" Wain, a major figure in the economic development of frontier Alaska in the early 20th century, and operated from 1908 until its closure due to Prohibition in 1918.

The building was listed on the National Register of Historic Places in 1980, and was delisted in 2019.

See also
National Register of Historic Places listings in Chugach Census Area, Alaska

References

1908 establishments in Alaska
Buildings and structures completed in 1908
Buildings and structures on the National Register of Historic Places in Chugach Census Area, Alaska
Cordova, Alaska
Drinking establishments on the National Register of Historic Places in Alaska
Former National Register of Historic Places in Alaska
Pre-statehood history of Alaska